Sergei Vasilyevich Zubatov (April 7 [March 26 O.S.], 1864 – March 15, 1917) was a famous Russian police administrator, best known as the advocate of "police socialism", which included creating legal, police-controlled trade unions.

Biography
Sergei Zubatov was born in Moscow, the son of a police chief. He was involved in revolutionary circles as a school boy, and was expelled at the age of 16, at his father's instigation. His father also made him marry an army officer's daughter, A. N. Mikhina, in the hope that it would keep him out of trouble. Instead, between them they ran a bookshop that became a gathering place for revolutionaries. In 1886, if not earlier, he was persuaded by N. S. Berdyaev, the head of the Moscow Okhrana, the department responsible for suppressing the revolutionary movement, to become an informant, under the threat of expulsion from Moscow. Information that he passed to the police led to the closure of three illegal printing shops, and the arrests of several revolutionaries, including Mikhail Gots. By 1888, rumours about his double life had spread through revolutionary circles, so he stopped acting as a spy, and in 1889 he joined the staff of Okhrana. He systematized security policing in Russia, using the typical methods then prevalent in Europe of plainclothes police detectives (known in Russia as filyory - ) whose actions he coordinated with the centerpiece of his system, undercover informants (секретные сотрудники). He was a master at interrogating radical activists and occasionally winning them over to his side, arguing that the Russian Empire could do more for the poor than could terrorists and agitators who would only bring down upon the people the heavy hand of reaction.

Despite rumors, he was never a Colonel (Polkovnik) in the Special Corps of Gendarmes, but he was rapidly promoted so that in 1896, at the age of 32, he was appointed head of the Moscow Okhrana Bureau, making him the official in charge of investigating and suppressing political dissent in Russia's second city.

Despite his deeply-held monarchist convictions, Zubatov earnestly believed that repression alone could not crush the revolutionary movement. Between 1901 and 1903 he therefore also promoted the organization of pro-government trade unions to channel protest away from agitation - a practice revolutionary activists named police socialism or lambasted as Zubatovshchina.

In February 1901, the authorities had to bring in Cossacks to suppress mass demonstrations by thousands of students and workers in Moscow. In May 1901, the Moscow Chief of Police General Dmitri Feodorovich Trepov allowed the community of mutual help of the workers in mechanized industry (Общество взаимного вспомоществования рабочих в механическом производстве) to hold its inaugural meeting in Moscow. The society was created by self-educated factory workers, with Zubatov's support, who were paid a stipend by the Okhrana. It provoked objections from factory owners, who claimed that it was inciting unrest, and from factory inspectors who felt that their authority was being undermined. The Prime Minister, Count Sergei Witte, backed their objections, but was unable to close down the experiment because Zubatov had the backing of the Tsar's uncle, Grand Duke Sergei Alexandrovich, Governor-General of Moscow. On 19 February 1902, Zubatov succeeded in orchestrating a loyal demonstration with religious overtones by about 50,000 workers, outside the Kremlin, in honour the former Tsar Alexander II - despite a call from the Moscow committee of the Russian Social Democratic Labour Party to boycott the ceremony.

In August 1902, Zubatov was transferred to St Petersburg, but his attempts to introduce 'police socialism' there were hindered by the greater awareness and suspicion of police agents. Other societies similar to the Moscow model were formed in Odessa, and Kiev. In Minsk, he encouraged the creation of the Jewish Independent Labour Party, to counter the influence of the Marxist General Jewish Labour Bund, and holding of the first legal Zionist Congress, in 1902. But Zubatov proved unable to persuade the government to enact any actual improvement in labour legislation. In July 1903, thousands of workers took part in a general strike in Odessa which lasted two weeks before violently repressed by police and Cossacks. A month later, on 19 August 1903, Interior Minister Vyacheslav von Plehve summoned Zubatov, accused him of fomenting strikes and betraying secrets, sacked him, and banned him from living in the St Petersburg or Moscow Governorates. The state-sponsored trade unions were disbanded. Many of its members joined the organization of Georgy Gapon, who led a demonstration of workers to present a petition to the tsar at the Winter Palace which led to the Bloody Sunday massacre and the beginning of the 1905 Russian Revolution. After the assassination of Plehve in July 1904, Zubatov was allowed back into the capital and invited to rejoin the police but refused, partly in order to protect the life of his son, whom he feared revolutionary activists might threaten. He retired to private life, living off his state pension.

Zubatov committed suicide during the February Revolution of March 1917 after hearing the news of the Emperor's abdication.

References

1864 births
1917 suicides
People from Moscow
People from Moskovsky Uyezd
Russian police officers
Politicians of the Russian Empire
Okhrana personnel
Russian monarchists